Nicholas James David Hodgson (born 20 October 1977) is an English drummer, backing vocalist, and songwriter, formerly of the indie rock band Kaiser Chiefs.

Early life
He attended St. Mary's Menston with Nick Baines and Simon Rix. He then went on to Trinity & All Saints University College in Horsforth, Leeds, where he studied Media. He later met Ricky Wilson and Andrew "Whitey" White at a mod night called Move on Up at The Underground in Leeds. Together they formed Runston Parva, later to be called Parva and now Kaiser Chiefs.

Together with bandmate Ricky Wilson, Hodgson started the Leeds club night Pigs "to give us something to look forward to". After giving the rest of the band a mix CD with songs he had been playing at Pigs, they formed Kaiser Chiefs, scrapping all their old songs and changing "the way we play, the way we dress, basically everything we could change without changing ... our faces".

Kaiser Chiefs
Hodgson is a founding member of Leeds indie rock band Kaiser Chiefs, and their drummer and main backing vocalist between 2003 and 2012. He takes lead vocals on tracks "Boxing Champ" and "Man On Mars". On 4 December 2012, Hodgson announced via his Twitter account that he had left Kaiser Chiefs to concentrate on other projects.

Solo work
Since his departure from Kaiser Chiefs, Hodgson has refocused his attentions on the studio. In an interview with NME, he spoke of his decision to split from the band, stating: "It was obvious really, because they know I love the studio and I love writing and I'm not mad about touring. I loved touring at some point, but I didn't love it all the time and I didn't love it as much as everyone else."

On 26 March 2017, Hodgson teased via his Twitter account that he was making a solo record by tweeting "If I tweet that I'm making solo material then I have to do it. Right?!" On 1 June 2017 he confirmed the album also via Twitter saying the album was going "nice".

On 4 December 2017, Hodgson performed new material, at Black's Club, London, for "The Society of the Golden Slippers".  This was stated as his debut performance as a solo artist.

On 26 January 2018, Hodgson released his solo album, Tell Your Friends, on Prediction Records. Much of the album is 1970s pop inspired in its sound, owing to the fact that Hodgson records on mostly 1970s instruments. As announced on his Twitter in late February 2018, Hodgson is already working on his second solo album. However, Hodgson confirmed in March 2020, that there is no plan to release new solo material in the near future, and he is instead continuing to focus on songwriting.

Songwriting
After being the main songwriter in Kaiser Chiefs, Hodgson continues to write for other people. He co-wrote "Bang Bang Bang" with Mark Ronson, MNDR and Q-Tip, which was released as the lead single from Ronson's third studio album, Record Collection, and went to No. 6 in the UK Singles Chart. Hodgson has worked with The Vamps, Kodaline, Olly Murs, Nina Nesbitt, Lower Than Atlantis, Dua Lipa, John Newman, Hurts, Dagny and James Arthur. He worked with Duran Duran and producer Mark Ronson on the Duran Duran album All You Need Is Now, co-writing the track "Too Bad You're So Beautiful". He has also written for Shirley Bassey. He co-wrote the lead song, "Feels Like Summer" for the Oscar, Golden Globe and Bafta-nominated film, Shaun the Sheep Movie (2015). Hodgson co-wrote and co-produced the 2017 single "Laidback" by Rat Boy.

Personal life
Hodgson is married, and has one child.

Discography
Studio albums
 Tell Your Friends (2018)

References

External links

1977 births
Living people
English rock drummers
British male drummers
English songwriters
English record producers
British indie rock musicians
Kaiser Chiefs members
Ivor Novello Award winners
Alumni of Leeds Trinity University
People educated at St. Mary's Catholic High School, Menston
21st-century drummers
Musicians from Leeds